Mr. Lucky may refer to:

 Mr. Lucky (film), a 1943 film starring Cary Grant
  Mr. Lucky (TV series), a 1959–1960 adventure/drama series by Blake Edwards
 "Mr. Lucky", theme to the 1959–1960 TV series, written by Henry Mancini
 Mr. Lucky (Chris Isaak album)
 Mr. Lucky (John Lee Hooker album)
 Mr. Lucky (Pete Thomas album)
 Mr. Lucky (Harold Mabern album)

See also 
 Mr. Lucky and the Gamblers, a 1960s American garage rock band
 Lucky Man (disambiguation)